Kuiwen is an urban district of the city of Weifang, Shandong province, China.

Administrative divisions
As 2012, this district is divided to 9 subdistricts.
Subdistricts

References

External links 
 Information page

County-level divisions of Shandong
Weifang